Piletocera flavomaculalis is a moth in the family Crambidae. It was described by Pagenstecher in 1884. It is found in Indonesia (Ambon Island).

References

flavomaculalis
Endemic fauna of Indonesia
Moths of Indonesia
Fauna of the Lesser Sunda Islands
Moths described in 1884